The sixteenth season of Saturday Night Live, an American sketch comedy series, originally aired in the United States on NBC between September 29, 1990, and May 18, 1991.

Cast
Extensive changes occurred before the start of the season. Nora Dunn and Jon Lovitz were both dropped from the show. Following her boycott of the episode hosted by Andrew Dice Clay the previous season, Dunn was not in good standing with Lorne Michaels. Dunn's initial five-year contract expired at the end of the previous season, but Michaels chose not to extend it due to the boycott controversy.

Before the season began, Lovitz requested time off so he could film Mom and Dad Save the World, which would cause him to miss the first several episodes of the season. Michaels refused, because he did not view this to be fair to the other cast members. Lovitz subsequently quit. However, he made several cameo appearances throughout the 16th season. 

With Dunn and Lovitz gone, Michaels was put in an unusual situation. Most of the cast had been on the show for five seasons. He did not want to be put in the spot of having to replace the entire cast all at once (and to avoid repeating Jean Doumanian's mistake—and his previous mistake in the case of the season 11 cast—of hiring a cast of new, inexperienced cast members with little to no comedic chemistry). Instead, he promoted writers Rob Schneider and David Spade to the cast and hired Chris Farley, Chris Rock and Julia Sweeney. He later hired Tim Meadows and Adam Sandler to the cast mid-season. 

Starting with this season, the cast was divided into three groups. A middle group was created, and this new category would be introduced with the word "with," following the introduction of the repertory players. The first cast members added to the new group were Farley and Rock, with Meadows and Sweeney added mid-season.

This season would also be the final season for Dennis Miller, Jan Hooks and A. Whitney Brown. Hooks left on her own terms at the end of the season, and Brown left the show mid-season to move on to other acting opportunities. Miller, who also departed at the end of the season, was at the time the longest running anchor of Weekend Update, having done the job for six full seasons, until Seth Meyers broke the record in season 38. However, Miller still holds the record as the longest solo anchor of Weekend Update as Meyers was paired with Amy Poehler in his first three seasons on Weekend Update and Cecily Strong in his final season on the show.

Phil Hartman was also planning on leaving the show, but NBC convinced Hartman to stay on for a few more seasons by promising him his own comedy show, which was later scrapped or never came to fruition.

Cast roster

Repertory players
Dana Carvey
Phil Hartman
Jan Hooks
Victoria Jackson
Dennis Miller
Mike Myers
Kevin Nealon

Middle players
Chris Farley
Tim Meadows (first episode: February 9, 1991)
Chris Rock
Julia Sweeney (first episode: November 10, 1990)

Featured players
A. Whitney Brown (final episode: March 16, 1991)
Al Franken
Adam Sandler (first episode: February 9, 1991)
Rob Schneider (first episode: October 27, 1990)
David Spade (first episode: November 10, 1990)

bold denotes Weekend Update anchor

Writers

Notable writers from season 16 included Jim Downey, Al Franken, Tom Davis, Jack Handey, Conan O'Brien, Rob Smigel and Bob Odenkirk.

Season 16 would prove to be the final year for O'Brien and Odenkirk as Saturday Night Live writers. O'Brien left to write for The Simpsons, and would later host NBC's Late Night and Tonight Show late night talk shows. Odenkirk would go on to write for future cast member Chris Elliott's Get a Life and The Dennis Miller Show as well as The Ben Stiller Show, for which he was also a cast member. In 1995, he would co-create and co-star on HBO's Mr. Show with Bob and David. He then also had a starring role in Breaking Bad and Better Call Saul.

Episodes

References

16
Saturday Night Live in the 1990s
1990 American television seasons
1991 American television seasons